This is a list of music for the cinema written by the Soviet composer Mikael Tariverdiev

List of films
Vsyo to, o chyom my tak dolgo mechtali (1997) 
Propavshaya ekspeditsiya (1996) (TV) 
Letnie lyudi (1995) 
Vorovka (1995) (TV)  
Vsyo vokrug zasypalo snegom (1995) 
Nezabudki (1994) (as M. Tariverdiyev) 
Roman 'alla russa' (1994) 
Russkiy regtaym (1993) 
Tantsuyushchiye prizraki (1992)
Ya obeshchala, ya uydu... (1992) 
I vozvrashchaetsya veter... (1991) 
Nochnye zabavy (1991) 
Smert v kino (1990) 
Zagadka Endkhauza (1989) 
Aelita, ne pristavay k muzhchinam! (1988) 
Etyud osveshcheniya (1988) 
Kommentariy k prosheniyu o pomilovanii (1988) 
Porog (1988) 
Razorvannyy krug (1987) 
Konets operatsii Rezident (1986) 
Mednyy angel (1984) 
Uchenik lekarya (1983) 
Predchuvstviye lyubvi (1982) 
Vozvrashcheniye rezidenta (1982) 
My, nizhepodpisavshiyesya (1981) (TV) 
Adam zhenitsya na Eve (1980) (TV) 
Dozhd v chuzhom gorode (1979) (TV) 
Staromodnaya komediya (1979) (as Mikael Tarawerdijew) 
Zolotaya rechka (1976) 
Ironiya sudby, ili S lyogkim parom! (Irony of Fate) (1975) (TV) 
Propavshaya ekspeditsiya (1975) 
"Semnadtsat mgnoveniy vesny" (Seventeen Moments of Spring) (1973) (mini) TV Series 
Zemlya, do vostrebovaniya (1972) 
Sudba rezidenta (1970) 
Korol-olen (1969) 
Tsena (1969) 
Malenky shcolny orcestr (1968)
Lyubit (1968) 
Vostochny koridor (1968) 
Proshchay (1967) 
Razbudite Mukhina (1967) 
Spasite utopayushchego (1967) 
Bolshaya ruda (1964) 
Dobro pozhalovat, ili postoronnim vkhod vospreshchyon (1964) 
Do svidaniya, malchiki! (1964) 
Do zavtra... (1964) 
Moy mladshiy brat (1962) 
Chelovek idyot za solntsem (1961) 
Dlinnyy den (1961) 
Yunost nashikh otsov (1958)

External links
 

Film scores
Lists of Soviet films